Kevin Ruf (born December 7, 1961) is an American actor and comedian. He recently starred in the Comedy Central show Halfway Home as Kenny Carlyle, the house supervisor of a halfway house.

Early life and education 
Born in Wilmington, Delaware, Ruf grew up in Saratoga, California and attended Saratoga High School, where he played on the school's football . Ruf graduated from the University of California, Berkeley.

Career 
He is a member of The Groundlings improvisational comedy theater and has guest written for Saturday Night Live. He appeared as the newsman in That Was The Week That Was on ABC's Primetime Live. He is also an attorney. In 2006, he argued and won a case before the California Supreme Court which expanded the rights of day laborers. The case was entitled Smith v. L'Oreal.

Ruf guest starred in a 2008 episode of the Comedy Central series Reno 911! playing Kyle Overstreet, a convict who has recently been released after ten years in prison and has sworn to get revenge on the officers who put him behind bars. Unfortunately, none of the police officers remember arresting Kyle, and they even struggle to remember his name despite meeting him several times throughout the episode.

Awards
Ruf was named a California Lawyer of the Year ("CLAY Award") in 2019 for his work in the California Supreme Court, arguing the winning side in the groundbreaking case, 
Dynamex Operations West, Inc. v. Superior Court.

Filmography

Film

Television

References

External links 
 

1961 births
Living people
Male actors from Wilmington, Delaware
American male comedians
American male television actors
American television writers
American male television writers
University of California, Berkeley alumni
People from Saratoga, California
Comedians from California
Screenwriters from California
Screenwriters from Delaware
21st-century American comedians
21st-century American screenwriters
21st-century American male writers